

See also 
 Lists of fossiliferous stratigraphic units in Europe
 Lists of fossiliferous stratigraphic units in Asia

References 
 

.
 Turkey
 Turkey
Fossiliferous stratigraphic units